1958 in Korea may refer to:
1958 in North Korea
1958 in South Korea